WETI was an FM radio station licensed to Lake Village, Arkansas and broadcast on a frequency of 103.5 MHz. WETI was last owned by Eternity Media Group.

The format was known as POWER 103.5 FM and played a mix of Classic Hip-Hop Old-School Funk and Blues.

The Federal Communications Commission deleted WETI's license and call sign on June 3, 2021.

References

External links

µ
Radio stations established in 2017
2017 establishments in Arkansas
Radio stations disestablished in 2021
2021 disestablishments in Arkansas
Defunct radio stations in the United States
µ